Alex Oundo (born 10 December 1943) is a Kenyan boxer. He competed in the men's lightweight event at the 1964 Summer Olympics. At the 1964 Summer Olympics, he defeated Bruno Arcari of Italy, before losing to Józef Grudzień of Poland.

References

1943 births
Living people
Kenyan male boxers
Olympic boxers of Kenya
Boxers at the 1964 Summer Olympics
Place of birth missing (living people)
Lightweight boxers